Zərdabi is a village and municipality in the Quba Rayon of Azerbaijan.  It has a population of 4,034.

References

External links

Populated places in Quba District (Azerbaijan)